Armstead Rhodes (June 2, 1918 – February 22, 1985) was an American Negro league first baseman in the 1940s.

A native of Tuscaloosa, Alabama, Rhodes played for the Chicago American Giants in 1940 and 1942. In seven recorded career games, he posted four hits in 26 plate appearances. Rhodes died in Flint, Michigan in 1985 at age 66.

References

External links
 and Baseball-Reference Black Baseball Stats and Seamheads

1918 births
1985 deaths
Chicago American Giants players
Baseball first basemen
Baseball players from Alabama
Sportspeople from Tuscaloosa, Alabama
20th-century African-American sportspeople